Southern Oromo, or Afaan Oromoo (after one of its dialects), is a variety of Oromo spoken in southern Ethiopia and northern Kenya by the Borana people. Günther Schlee also notes that it is the native language of a number of related peoples, such as the Sakuye.

Dialects are Borana proper (Boran, Borena), possibly Arsi (Arussi, Arusi) and Guji (Gujji, Jemjem) in Ethiopia and, in Kenya, Karayu, Salale (Selale), Gabra (Gabbra, Gebra) and possibly Orma and Waata.

The language is locally and commonly known as ''Afaan Oromoo("Oromo language").

References 

Languages of Ethiopia
Languages of Kenya
Oromo groups